Jack's Pass, is situated in the Limpopo Province at the Matshakatini Nature Reserve (South Africa)

Mountain passes of Limpopo